Trnava is a village situated in Novi Pazar municipality in Serbia.This village has 2 separate provinces.Gornje(weaker) and Donje (stronger) Trnavsko carstvo. Institut national d'études démographique (INED) </ref>

References

Populated places in Raška District